Taking Heaven By Storm is a contemporary Christian music album by Steve Camp and was released by Warner Alliance in 1993, serving as Camp's debut with that label. This album is best known for the title track. This is the first non-compilation album to feature a recording of an earlier song, which Camp would do with some of his albums near the end of his recording career. Here, the song was "It's a Dying World"; from the 1984 Word release of the same name.

It was produced by Michael Omartian, who co-wrote some of the tracks and also produced the album Mercy in the Wilderness.

Track listing 

 "Taking Heaven By Storm" (Camp, Rob Frazier, Michael Omartian) – 5:38
 "Give Me Some Time" (Camp, Gary Chapman) – 4:01
 "It's a Dying World" (Camp) – 4:44
 "The Love I Found In You" (Camp, Chapman, Omartian) – 3:48
 "He is Able" (Camp, Frazier) – 4:27
 "I'm Not Ashamed" (Camp, Frazier) – 3:48
 "I'm Committed to You" (Camp, Chapman, Frazier) – 4:00
 "All Things For Good" (Camp, Frazier, Omartian) – 4:04
 "The Lord's Prayer" (Camp, Omartian) – 4:33
 "In the Hands of God" (Camp, Claire Cloninger, John G. Elliott) – 3:18

Personnel 

 Steve Camp – lead and backing vocals, arrangements
 Michael Omartian – acoustic piano, keyboards, drum programming, backing vocals, arrangements
 Gary Chapman – guitars
 George Cocchini – guitars
 Dann Huff – guitars
 Joe Chemay – bass
 Jack Kelly – drums
 Paul Leim – drums
 Dan Higgins – saxophones
 Jerry Hey – trumpets
 Susanne Christian – backing vocals
 Kim Fleming – backing vocals
 Kurt Howell – backing vocals
 Marty McCall – backing vocals
 Chris Rodriguez – backing vocals
 Alfie Silas – backing vocals
 Linda Tavani – backing vocals

Production

 Michael Omartian – producer
 Neal Joseph – executive producer
 Janet Hinde – production coordinator
 Terry Christian – engineer, mixing at Lighthouse Recorders, Los Angeles, California
 Kevin Becka – assistant engineer
 Jim Dineen – assistant engineer
 Mick Higgins – assistant engineer
 John Hurley – assistant engineer
 Soundhouse Studios, Hollywood, California – recording location
 Tejas Recorders, Franklin, Tennessee – recording location
 Steve Hall – mastering at Future Disc, Hollywood, California
 Buddy Jackson – art direction
 Sam Knight – design
 Mark Tucker – photography
 Claudia McConnell – stylist

References 

1993 albums
Albums produced by Michael Omartian
Steve Camp albums
Warner Music Group albums